Max Kohler (6 October 1919, Solothurn – 1 April 2001, Zurich) was a Swiss painter.

References
This article was initially translated from the German Wikipedia.

20th-century Swiss painters
Swiss male painters
1919 births
1999 deaths
20th-century Swiss male artists